Beaufortia empetrifolia, commonly known as south coast beaufortia, is a plant in the myrtle family, Myrtaceae and is endemic to the southwest of Western Australia. It is a highly branched shrub with small, crowded leaves and pinkish to purple flowers in small, bottlebrush-like spikes in the warmer months. It is similar to Beaufortia micrantha except that its leaves are slightly larger.

Description
The leaves are arranged in opposite pairs (decussate) so they make four rows along the stems.

The flowers have 5 sepals, 5 petals and 5 bundles of stamens with usually three to five stamens each. Flowering can occur in almost any month, depending on the weather and is followed by fruits which are woody capsules.

Taxonomy and naming
Melaleuca empetrifolia was first formally described in 1828 by the German botanist, Ludwig Reichenbach in Iconographia Botanica Exotica. In 1843, Johannes Schauer recognised it as Beaufortia empetrifolia. Lyndley Craven proposes combining Beaufortia and several other related genera with Melaleuca, in which case, Reichenbach's original name would be restored.

Distribution and habitat
Beaufortia empetrifolia mainly occurs in and between the Albany and Esperance districts in the Esperance Plains, Hampton, Jarrah Forest and Mallee bioregions of south-western Western Australia. It usually grows in sand, often near granite outcrops.

Conservation
Beaufortia empetrifolia is classified as "not threatened" by the Western Australian Government Department of Biodiversity, Conservation and Attractions.

References

empetrifolia
Plants described in 1843
Endemic flora of Western Australia
Taxa named by Ludwig Reichenbach